Stictane umbrata is a moth in the family Erebidae. It was described by van Eecke in 1927. It is found on Sumatra in Indonesia.

References

Moths described in 1927
Nudariina